Euonymus assamicus is a species of plant in the family Celastraceae. It is endemic to Assam.

References

assamicus
Flora of Assam (region)
Endangered plants
Taxonomy articles created by Polbot